Kevin Donnelly Nichols is the ninth and current bishop of the Episcopal Diocese of Bethlehem.

Biography
On April 28, 2018, Nichols was elected Bishop of Bethlehem on the first ballot of a special convention that took place in the Cathedral of the Nativity in Bethlehem, Pennsylvania. He was consecrated on September 15, 2018 at the First Presbyterian Church in Allentown, Pennsylvania by Presiding Bishop Michael Curry. He was installed in the Cathedral of the Nativity on October 12, 2018. 

Nichols was originally ordained a Roman Catholic priest after receiving his Master of Divinity from St. Mary's Seminary and University in Baltimore.  On December 11, 1999 he was received into the Episcopal priesthood and became rector of St Stephen's Church in Pittsfield, New Hampshire and then of St Andrew's Church in Hopkinton, New Hampshire. He was also chief operating officer and canon for mission resources in the Diocese of New Hampshire.

See also
 List of Episcopal bishops of the United States
 Historical list of the Episcopal bishops of the United States

References

Living people
Episcopalians from Pennsylvania
Converts to Anglicanism from Roman Catholicism
Year of birth missing (living people)
St. Mary's Seminary and University alumni
Episcopal bishops of Bethlehem